Mickey in School is a 1928 silent short film in Larry Darmour's Mickey McGuire series starring a young Mickey Rooney. Directed by Albert Herman, the two-reel short was released to theaters on February 6, 1928, by FBO.

Synopsis
It's time for Mickey and the kids to go back to school. During a game of tug-of-war against Stinkie Davis and his pals, the kids accidentally start a fire in the school.

Notes
An edited version was released to television in the 1960s as a part of the Mischief Makers series, under the title "Back to School".
Mickey McGuire's full name is revealed to be "Michael Patrick Aloyisius McGuire".

Cast
Mickey Rooney - Mickey McGuire
Jimmy Robinson - Hambone Johnson
Delia Bogard - Tomboy Taylor
Unknown - Katrink
Unknown - Stinkie Davis
Kendall McComas - Scorpions member

External links 
 

1928 films
1928 comedy films
American black-and-white films
American silent short films
Mickey McGuire short film series
1928 short films
Silent American comedy films
American comedy short films
1920s American films